"Cadillac, Cadillac" is a song recorded by American rock band Train for their seventh studio album Bulletproof Picasso. The song was written by Pat Monahan, Butch Walker, and Al Anderson, and was produced by the latter two as well as Butch Walker. It was released on September 29, 2014 as the second single from the album.

Music video
A music video to accompany the release of "Cadillac, Cadillac" was first released onto YouTube on 31 October 2014 at a total length of three minutes and 29 seconds.

Track listing

Chart performance

Weekly charts

Release history

References

2014 songs
Songs written by Butch Walker
Song recordings produced by Butch Walker
Columbia Records singles
Train (band) songs
Songs written by Pat Monahan
Songs written by Al Anderson (NRBQ)